Pennekamp (foaled 1992) is American-bred, French-trained Thoroughbred racehorse and sire.
Notable people with the surname include:
Amanda Pennekamp (born 1981), American model and television personality
Erich Pennekamp (1929–2013), German water polo player
John Pennekamp, namesake of the John Pennekamp Coral Reef State Park
Marianne Pennekamp (1924–2021), German-born American social worker and Holocaust survivor

Surnames of German origin